Henrietta "Harriet" Sheppard, née Campbell (1786-1858) was a Canadian naturalist and botanist.  She was noted for studying and publishing on birds, shells, and plants of the Quebec region.  Working with Anne Mary Perceval and Lady Dalhousie she collected plants of the region.

References 

Canadian women botanists
19th-century Canadian women scientists
1786 births
1858 deaths
19th-century Canadian botanists